Gazoros or Gazorus was a town mentioned by Ptolemy to be in the region of Edonis or Odomantike and also by inscriptions of Hellenistic and Roman times. Later in the 4th century BC, it was annexed to the Macedonian kingdom and made a polis under Philip II of Macedon or the Antigonids. Artemis Gazoria or Gazoreitis was worshiped all over the region till Roman times. In the imperial times, according to epigraphic evidences, Gazoros was a member of a federation of five cities ("Pentapolis") that had its seat in the ancient city of Sirra (today Serres).

Gazoros is located in Greece 3 km to the east of the modern village with the same name, on the hill of "Haghios Athanasios". The modern town Gazoros is part of the municipality Nea Zichni, in the Serres regional unit of Central Macedonia.

See also
List of settlements in the Serres regional unit

References

Greek Travel Pages

Lower Macedonia
Populated places in Serres (regional unit)
Archaeological sites in Macedonia (Greece)
Geography of ancient Thrace
Central Macedonia